The Veljul Negreștilor is a left tributary of the river Velju Mare in Romania. It flows into the Velju Mare near Mădăras. Near Homorog much of its flow is diverted by the Criș Collector Canal towards the Crișul Negru near Tămașda.

References

Rivers of Romania
Rivers of Bihor County